The arabesque is a form of artistic decoration consisting of "surface decorations based on rhythmic linear patterns of scrolling and interlacing foliage, tendrils" or plain lines, often combined with other elements. Another definition is "Foliate ornament, used in the Islamic world, typically using leaves, derived from stylised half-palmettes, which were combined with spiralling stems".  It usually consists of a single design which can be 'tiled' or seamlessly repeated as many times as desired. Within the very wide range of Eurasian decorative art that includes motifs matching this basic definition, the term "arabesque" is used consistently as a technical term by art historians to describe only elements of the decoration found in two phases: Islamic art from about the 9th century onwards, and European decorative art from the Renaissance onwards. Interlace and scroll decoration are terms used for most other types of similar patterns. 

Arabesques are a fundamental element of Islamic art but they develop what was already a long tradition by the coming of Islam. The past and current usage of the term in respect of European art is confused and inconsistent. Some Western arabesques derive from Islamic art, but others are closely based on ancient Roman decorations. In the West they are essentially found in the decorative arts, but because of the generally non-figurative nature of Islamic art, arabesque decoration is there often a very prominent element in the most significant works, and plays a large part in the decoration of architecture.

Claims are often made regarding the theological significance of the arabesque and its origin in a specifically Islamic view of the world; however, these are without support from written historical sources since, like most medieval cultures, the Islamic world has not left us documentation of their intentions in using the decorative motifs they did. At the popular level such theories often appear uninformed as to the wider context of the arabesque. In similar fashion, proposed connections between the arabesque and Arabic knowledge of geometry remains a subject of debate; not all art historians are persuaded that such knowledge had reached, or was needed by, those creating arabesque designs, although in certain cases there is evidence that such a connection did exist.  The case for a connection with Islamic mathematics is much stronger for the development of the geometric patterns with which arabesques are often combined in art.  Geometric decoration often uses patterns that are made up of straight lines and regular angles that somewhat resemble curvilinear arabesque patterns; the extent to which these too are described as arabesque varies between different writers.

Islamic arabesque 
The Islamic arabesque was probably invented in Baghdad around the 10th century. It first appeared as a distinctive and original development in Islamic art in carved marble panels from around this time.
What makes Islamic arabesque unique and distinct from vegetal decorations of other cultures is its infinite correspondence and the fact that it can be extended beyond its actual limits. The arabesque developed out of the long-established traditions of plant-based scroll ornament in the cultures taken over by the early Islamic conquests. Early Islamic art, for example in the famous 8th-century mosaics of the Great Mosque of Damascus, often contained plant-scroll patterns, in that case by Byzantine artists in their usual style. The plants most often used are stylized versions of the acanthus, with its emphasis on leafy forms, and the vine, with an equal emphasis on twining stems.  The evolution of these forms into a distinctive Islamic type was complete by the 11th century, having begun in the 8th or 9th century in works like the Mshatta Facade. In the process of development the plant forms became increasingly simplified and stylized.  The relatively abundant survivals of stucco reliefs from the walls of palaces (but not mosques) in Abbasid Samarra, the Islamic capital between 836 and 892, provide examples of three styles, Styles A, B, and C, though more than one of these may appear on the same wall, and their chronological sequence is not certain. 
 
Though the broad outline of the process is generally agreed, there is a considerable diversity of views held by specialist scholars on detailed issues concerning the development, categorization and meaning of the arabesque.  The detailed study of Islamic arabesque forms was begun by Alois Riegl in his formalist study Stilfragen: Grundlegungen zu einer Geschichte der Ornamentik (Problems of style: foundations for a history of ornament) of 1893, who in the process developed his influential concept of the Kunstwollen.  Riegl traced formalistic continuity and development in decorative plant forms from ancient Egyptian art and other ancient Near Eastern civilizations through the classical world to the Islamic arabesque.  While the Kunstwollen has few followers today, his basic analysis of the development of forms has been confirmed and refined by the wider corpus of examples known today. Jessica Rawson has recently extended the analysis to cover Chinese art, which Riegl did not cover, tracing many elements of Chinese decoration back to the same tradition, the shared background helping make the assimilation of Chinese motifs into Persian art after the Mongol invasion harmonious and productive.

Many arabesque patterns disappear at (or "under", as it often appears to a viewer) a framing edge without ending and thus can be regarded as infinitely extendable outside the space they actually occupy; this was certainly a distinctive feature of the Islamic form, though not without precedent. Most but not all foliage decoration in the preceding cultures terminated at the edge of the occupied space, although infinitely repeatable patterns in foliage are very common in the modern world in wallpaper and textiles.

Typically, in earlier forms there is no attempt at realism; no particular species of plant is being imitated, and the forms are often botanically impossible or implausible. "Leaf" forms typically spring sideways from the stem, in what is often called a "half-palmette" form, named after its distant and very different looking ancestor in ancient Egyptian and Greek ornament.  New stems spring from leaf-tips, a type often called honeysuckle, and the stems often have no tips, winding endlessly out of the space.  The early Mshatta Facade is recognisably some sort of vine, with conventional leaves on the end of short stalks and bunches of grapes or berries, but later forms usually lack these.  Flowers are rare until about 1500, after which they appear more often, especially in Ottoman art, and are often identifiable by species.  In Ottoman art the large and feathery leaves called saz became very popular, and were elaborated in drawings showing just one or more large leaves.  Eventually floral decoration mostly derived from Chinese styles, especially those of Chinese porcelain, replaces the arabesque in many types of work, such as pottery, textiles and miniatures.

Significance in Islam 

The arabesques and geometric patterns of Islamic art are often said to arise from the Islamic view of the world (see above). The depiction of animals and people is generally discouraged, which explains the preference for abstract geometric patterns.

There are two modes to arabesque art. The first mode recalls the principles that govern the order of the world. These principles include the bare basics of what makes objects structurally sound and, by extension, beautiful (i.e. the angle and the fixed/static shapes that it creates—esp. the truss). In the first mode, each repeating geometric form has a built-in symbolism ascribed to it. For example, the square, with its four equilateral sides, is symbolic of the equally important elements of nature: earth, air, fire and water. Without any one of the four, the physical world, represented by a circle that inscribes the square, would collapse upon itself and cease to exist. The second mode is based upon the flowing nature of plant forms. This mode recalls the feminine nature of life giving. In addition, upon inspection of the many examples of Arabesque art, some would argue that there is in fact a third mode, the mode of Islamic calligraphy.

Instead of recalling something related to the 'True Reality' (the reality of the spiritual world), Islam considers calligraphy a visible expression of the highest art of all; the art of the spoken word (the transmittal of thoughts and of history). In Islam, the most important document to be transmitted orally is the Qur'an. Proverbs and complete passages from the Qur'an can be seen today in Arabesque art. The coming together of these three forms creates the Arabesque, and this is a reflection of unity arising from diversity; a basic tenet of Islam.

The arabesque may be equally thought of as both art and science. The artwork is at the same time mathematically precise, aesthetically pleasing, and symbolic. Due to this duality of creation, the artistic part of this equation may be further subdivided into both secular and religious artwork. However, for many Muslims there is no distinction; all forms of art, the natural world, mathematics and science are seen to be creations of God and therefore reflections of the same thing: God's will expressed through his creation. In other words, man can discover the geometric forms that constitute the arabesque, but these forms always existed before as part of God's creation, as shown in this picture.

There is great similarity between arabesque artwork from very different geographic regions. In fact, the similarities are so pronounced that it is sometimes difficult for experts to tell where a given style of arabesque comes from. The reason for this is that the science and mathematics that are used to construct Arabesque artwork are universal. Therefore, for most Muslims, the best artwork that can be created by man for use in the Mosque is artwork that displays the underlying order and unity of nature. The order and unity of the material world, they believe, is a mere ghostly approximation of the spiritual world, which for many Muslims is the place where the only true reality exists. Discovered geometric forms, therefore, exemplify this perfect reality because God's creation has been obscured by the sins of man.

Mistakes in repetitions may be intentionally introduced as a show of humility by artists who believe only Allah can produce perfection, although this theory is disputed.
Arabesque art consists of a series of repeating geometric forms which are occasionally accompanied by calligraphy. Ettinghausen et al. describe the arabesque as a "vegetal design consisting of full...and half palmettes [as] an unending continuous pattern...in which each leaf grows out of the tip of another." To the adherents of Islam, the Arabesque is symbolic of their united faith and the way in which traditional Islamic cultures view the world.

Terminology and Western arabesque

Arabesque is a French term derived from the Italian word arabesco, meaning "in the Arabic style". The term was first used in Italian, where rabeschi was used in the 16th century as a term for "pilaster ornaments featuring acanthus decoration", specifically "running scrolls" that ran vertically up a panel or pilaster, rather than horizontally along a frieze.  The book Opera nuova che insegna a le donne a cuscire … laqual e intitolata Esempio di raccammi (A New Work that Teaches Women how to Sew … Entitled "Samples of Embroidery"), published in Venice in 1530, includes "groppi moreschi e rabeschi", Moorish knots and arabesques.

From there it spread to England, where Henry VIII owned, in an inventory of 1549, an agate cup with a "fote and Couer of siluer and guilt enbossed with Rebeske worke", and William Herne or Heron, Serjeant Painter from 1572 to 1580, was paid for painting Elizabeth I's barge with "rebeske work".  Unfortunately the styles so described can only be guessed at, although the design by Hans Holbein for a covered cup for Jane Seymour in 1536 (see gallery) already has zones in both Islamic-derived arabesque/moresque style (see below) and classically derived acanthus volutes.

Another related term is moresque, meaning "Moorish"; Randle Cotgrave's A Dictionarie of the French and English Tongues of 1611 defines this as: "a rude or anticke painting, or carving, wherin the feet and tayles of beasts, &c, are intermingled with, or made to resemble, a kind of wild leaves, &c." and "arabesque", in its earliest use cited in the OED (but as a French word), as "Rebeske work; a small and curious flourishing".  In France "arabesque" first appears in 1546, and "was first applied in the latter part of the 17th century" to grotesque ornament, "despite the classical origin of the latter", especially if without human figures in it—a distinction still often made, but not consistently observed.

Over the following centuries, the three terms "grotesque", "moresque", and "arabesque" were used largely interchangeably in English, French, and German for styles of decoration derived at least as much from the European past as the Islamic world, with "grotesque" gradually acquiring its main modern meaning, related more to Gothic gargoyles and caricature than to either Pompeii-style Roman painting or Islamic patterns. Meanwhile, the word "arabesque" was now being applied to Islamic art itself, by 1851 at the latest, when John Ruskin uses it in The Stones of Venice.  Writers over the last decades have attempted to salvage meaningful distinctions between the words from the confused wreckage of historical sources.

Peter Fuhring, a specialist in the history of ornament, says that (also in a French context): The ornament known as moresque in the fifteenth and sixteenth centuries (but now more commonly called arabesque) is characterized by bifurcated scrolls composed of branches forming interlaced foliage patterns. These basic motifs gave rise to numerous variants, for example, where the branches, generally of a linear character, were turned into straps or bands. ... It is characteristic of the moresque, which is essentially a surface ornament, that it is impossible to locate the pattern's beginning or end. ... Originating in the Middle East, they were introduced to continental Europe via Italy and Spain ... Italian examples of this ornament, which was often used for bookbindings and embroidery, are known from as early as the late fifteenth century.

Fuhring notes that grotesques were "confusingly called arabesques in eighteenth century France", but in his terminology "the major types of ornament that appear in French sixteenth century etchings and engraving ... can be divided into two groups. The first includes ornaments adopted from antiquity: grotesques, architectural ornaments such as the orders, foliage scrolls and self-contained elements such as trophies, terms and vases. A second group, far smaller than the first, comprises modern ornaments: moresques, interlaced bands, strapwork, and elements such as cartouches"—categories he goes on to discuss individually.

The moresque or arabesque style was especially popular and long-lived in the Western arts of the book: bookbindings decorated in gold tooling, borders for illustrations, and printer's ornaments for decorating empty spaces on the page. In this field the technique of gold tooling had also arrived in the 15th century from the Islamic world, and indeed much of the leather itself was imported from there. Small motifs in this style have continued to be used by conservative book designers up to the present day.

According to Harold Osborne, in France, the "characteristic development of the French arabesque combined bandwork deriving from the moresque with decorative acanthus foliage radiating from C-scrolls connected by short bars". Apparently starting in embroidery, it then appears in garden design before being used in Northern Mannerist painted decorative schemes "with a central medallion combined with acanthus and other forms" by Simon Vouet and then Charles Lebrun who used "scrolls of flat bandwork joined by horizontal bars and contrasting with ancanthus scrolls and palmette." More exuberant arabesque designs by Jean Bérain the Elder are an early "intimation" of the Rococo, which was to take the arabesque into three dimensions in reliefs.

The use of "arabesque" as an English noun first appears, in relation to painting, in William Beckford's novel Vathek in 1786. Arabesque is also used as a term for complex freehand pen flourishes in drawing or other graphic media. The Grove Dictionary of Art will have none of this confusion, and says flatly: "Over the centuries the word has been applied to a wide variety of winding and twining vegetal decoration in art and meandering themes in music, but it properly applies only to Islamic art", so contradicting the definition of 1888 still found in the Oxford English Dictionary: "A species of mural or surface decoration in colour or low relief, composed in flowing lines of branches, leaves, and scroll-work fancifully intertwined. Also fig[uratively]. As used in Moorish and Arabic decorative art (from which, almost exclusively, it was known in the Middle Ages), representations of living creatures were excluded; but in the arabesques of Raphael, founded on the ancient Græco-Roman work of this kind, and in those of Renaissance decoration, human and animal figures, both natural and grotesque, as well as vases, armour, and objects of art, are freely introduced; to this the term is now usually applied, the other being distinguished as Moorish Arabesque, or Moresque."

Printing
A major use of the arabesque style has been artistic printing, for example of book covers and page decoration. Repeating geometric patterns worked well with traditional printing, since they could be printed from metal type like letters if the type was placed together; as the designs have no specific connection to the meaning of a text, the type can be reused in many different editions of different works. Robert Granjon, a French printer of the sixteenth century, has been credited with the first truly interlocking arabesque printing, but other printers had used many other kinds of ornaments in the past. The idea was rapidly used by many other printers. After a period of disuse in the nineteenth century, when a more minimal page layout became popular with printers like Bodoni and Didot, the concept returned to popularity with the arrival of the Arts and Crafts movement, Many fine books from the period 1890–1960 have arabesque decorations, sometimes on paperback covers. Many digital serif fonts include arabesque pattern elements thought to be complementary to the mood of the font; they are also often sold as separate designs.

Notes

References 
 Canby, Sheila, Islamic art in detail, US edn., Harvard University Press, 2005, Google books
Richard Ettinghausen, Oleg Grabar, and Marilyn Jenkins-Madina, Islamic Art and Architecture, 650-1250. (New Haven:  Yale UP, 2001)
 Fuhring, Peter, Renaissance Ornament Prints; The French Contribution, in Karen Jacobson, ed (often wrongly cat. as George Baselitz), The French Renaissance in Prints, 1994, Grunwald Center, UCLA, 
 Harthan, John P., Bookbinding, 1961, HMSO (for the Victoria and Albert Museum)
 Rawson, Jessica, Chinese Ornament: The Lotus and the Dragon, 1984, British Museum Publications, 
 Osborne, Harold (ed), The Oxford Companion to the Decorative Arts, 1975, OUP, 
 Tabbaa, Yasser, The transformation of Islamic art during the Sunni revival, I.B.Tauris, 2002, Google books

External links 

 Abdullahi Y.,  Embi M. R. B, Evolution Of Abstract Vegetal Ornaments On Islamic Architecture, International Journal of Architectural Research, 2015, Archnet-IJAR

Arabic art
Arabic architecture
Visual arts genres
Visual motifs
Moorish architecture
Islamic culture
Islamic architectural elements
Islamic art
Ornaments
Arab inventions